High Precision Systems is a holding company within the Russian state-owned Rostec group involved in the defence-industry complex.

It focuses on high-precision systems and weapons for the combat tactical zone. It implements the full production cycle of weapons and defence equipment, from generating ideas to product distribution.

According to Jane's Information Group, Rostec is seeking to sell a 49% stake in High Precision Systems.

Structure
Subsidiaries of the holding:
 KBP Instrument Design Bureau
 KB Tochmash
 KB Mashinostroyeniya
 Safonovsky Meteorological Instruments Plant
 Tulatochmash
 Shcheglovsky Val
 AO CKBA
 Tula Arms Plant
 TsKIB SOO
 Volsky Mechanical Plant
 All-Russian Research Institute Signal
 Saratov aggregate plant
 Serpukhov factory Metallist
 Central Research Institute for Automation and Hydraulics
 SKB Turbine
 Degtyarev plant
 Kovrov Electromechanical Plant
 Tula Cartridge Plant
 JSC Rotor
 JSC Nytva
 Tulamashzavod

References

External links
 Official website

 
Technology companies established in 2009
Manufacturing companies based in Moscow
2009 establishments in Russia